Troitskoye is a rural locality (a selo) in Pribaykalsky District, Republic of Buryatia, Russia. The population was 497 as of 2010. There are 8 streets.

Geography 
Troitskoye is located 36 km southwest of Turuntayevo (the district's administrative centre) by road. Talovka is the nearest rural locality.

References 

Rural localities in Okinsky District